Catedral is a district of the San José canton, in the San José province of Costa Rica, it is one of the four administrative units that form San José downtown properly.

Toponymy 
The district receives its name because of the Cathedral and the catholic Archdiocese of San José, the only archdiocese in the country which lies between its boundaries, along with several other government buildings.

Geography 
Catedral has an area of  km² and an elevation of  metres.

Catedral is on the center-east of the canton, and has a small portion of boundary with Montes de Oca Canton at its eastern part. The division also borders (clockwards) Zapote district to the east, San Sebastián district to the south, Hospital and Merced districts to the west, and El Carmen district to the north.

Locations
This district comprises several "barrios" or neighbourhoods, like Bellavista, California (part of it), Carlos María Jiménez, Dolorosa (part of it), González Lahman, Güell, La Cruz, Lomas de Ocloro, Luján, Miflor, Naciones Unidas, Pacífico (part of it), San Cayetano (part of it), Soledad, Tabacalera, Vasconia. Some of the buildings between its limits are:

 National Theatre of Costa Rica. The country's most important theater and cultural reference.
 Caja Costarricense del Seguro Social. Government office in charge of medical and social security.
 Cathedral of San José. Main church of the city and home of the archbishop.
 Tribunals of Justice. In charge of the judiciary power on the country.

Demographics 

For the 2011 census, Catedral had a population of  inhabitants.   The population density is the highest of the four downtown districts.

Transportation

Road transportation 
The district is covered by the following road routes:
 National Route 2
 National Route 175
 National Route 204
 National Route 209
 National Route 213
 National Route 215
 National Route 218

Rail transportation 
The Interurbano Line operated by Incofer goes through this district.

External links
Municipalidad de San José. Distrito Catedral – Website of San Jose Mayor, includes a map of the district and related info.

References 

Districts of San José Province
Populated places in San José Province